This is a list of characters for the Spider Riders novels and anime series.

Spider Riders
A group of elite warriors mounting on each spiders. They use between armour and weapon.

 Hunter Steele
 
 A boy who falls into the subterranean Inner World, and becomes a Spider Rider with his newfound battle spider "partner", Shadow. They both argue quite a lot, mainly because of Hunter's cluelessness, ignorance and Shadow's pride and desire to work alone as well as the belief that he doesn't need the help of others. It is unknown whether the prophecy refers to him, thus it is unknown if he is destined to be Arachna's salvation or its destruction. It is also shown in the TV series that he has affections for Corona and admires her good spirit but is too shy to share them. In the episode "Smells Like Team Spider," he unknowingly stares at Corona while she is marveling at the flowers. When they are battling the Invectids, his mind is calmed by the image of Corona's face. Lastly, when Igneous asks what changed Hunter's mind about the flowers, he becomes a bit embarrassed as it was Corona's image that changed him. Since Corona was the first person to discover Hunter, he has known her for the longest time, besides Shadow. Hunter may have a romantic relationship with Corona and their spiders might too. He also caught Corona in her sleeping shirt once in which she threw her pillow at him. Hunter's grandfather, Digger, was also a Spider Rider and an earthling. He knew the hero Quake. Hunter's weapon is an Axial Pike. When he gains the power of an oracle key, his left shoulder pad grows larger and can shoot webs and his special attack is electra twist. When he uses 2 oracle keys, his right shoulder pad transforms, gets a larger shield, a long sword, two non-flying wings grow and his special attack is blue bolt. When he uses 3 or 4 keys, his wings retract and grow 4 metal spider legs and his special attack is blue wave. He often says, "Never Give Up!"

 Corona
 
 Discovering Hunter and Shadow, she escorts the new team to Arachna so they may be officially inducted to the ranks of the Spider Riders. She seems to care a lot for Hunter, as does her spider for Shadow. She also has romantic feelings for Hunter. She glows (using her power) most of the time when Hunter is deeply in battle and gets hurt. This proves that she could be the Oracle's chosen one just like Aqune. She becomes especially worried when Hunter is hurt or in danger and becomes quite jealous when Hunter's guy nature foolishly allows him to mention spending some time the night before with an unknown girl (Princess Sparkle) by pushing him into the fountain he slept next to that night. In "Hunter's Holiday," Corona clearly expresses her desire to spend some time with Hunter alone but when he refuses she takes out her rage by practicing on targets with Hunter's face on them. At the last episode, she says "My Hunter." Though she is taller and more mature than Hunter, both are the same age (stated to be eleven, though they act around twelve to thirteen years old. In the Japanese version, both are thirteen). She and her battle spider, Venus, make a great team. She has no family and was adopted by twins. When they found her, Corona had a manacle. They as well as Corona's home town believe she is dating Hunter. It was revealed that she is Aqune's long lost sister (she appears to be younger but this is unknown) and that they are both "Oracle Handmaids". Her weapons are a bow and arrows.

 Igneous
 
 A leading Spider Rider and captain of the Arachna military. His name mirrors Magma's—when magma cools, it becomes igneous rock. Igneous is calm, gentle and has quite a strategic mind. Igneous takes Hunter's training seriously and almost acts as a mentor to Hunter, to his annoyance. He challenged Hunter and Shadow to a duel when they joined the Riders, but it was only to see if Hunter could cooperate with Shadow. Igneous was part of the Arachna Knights, where he teamed up with a long-time friend Slate. Both were known as "Claw" and "Fang" and they proved to be quite powerful, especially since Igneous did not call his spider Flame to assist. Regardless of his grade, Igneous is proud to serve the royalty of the Arachna Kingdom, and always offers his help to prince Lumen and princess Sparkle. His weapon is a cavalry lance and one of his attacks is a flamethrower coming out of the tip of the lance. He has a crush on the Queen Illuma which resulted in Igneous being temporarily heart-broken. Igneous had a fan club of Arachna's castle's females, but while he was away to Nuuma, they had found boyfriends, leaving him crushed. He is also afraid of ghosts, but won't admit it and says they don't exist (Although he has seen the Lost Mariner).

 Prince Lumen
 
 Leader of the Spider Riders and the Prince of Arachna. He is rather lazy for a ruler, preferring diplomatic solutions over fights, even against the Invectids. Some say it is because his spider Ebony is so powerful that he is afraid to let it loose. He would much rather negotiate with the enemy and only fight when absolutely needed. Lumen is bright, loquacious, and loves cute girls. His weapon is a chain sword.

 Princess Sparkle
 
 The younger sister of Lumen. She is the one who points out that Hunter might save, not destroy, the Inner World. She also visits Hunter in the night and advises him to bond with Shadow and when Hunter first sees her, he blushes while she giggles. Sparkle is very adventurous. Her spider is Hotarla, and is very small, and as a Spider Rider, her body becomes a bit older, and taller, making her look adult/teen-like in her Rider form. Her weapon of choice is a yo yo-like device, with which she pummeled Grasshop to submission when he was trying to get away with one of the keys. She was the first one to trust Grasshop, causing him to change his ways. She is also the only one who calls him "Uncle Hop".

 Magma
 
 Unaffiliated with the Arachna military, he is a "lone rider" with his partner Brutus. He made a promise to find the purple spider Portia, supposed to be Brutus's younger sister, and this promise keeps him from joining the ranks of Arachna. He later joins up with Hunter and the others to prevent the Invectids from stealing the Oracle Keys. He is somewhat obsessed with rescuing Portia from the Invectids. Magma is a great admirer of the hero Quake; each time he sees Quake in action, he has tears streaming from his eyes. His weapon is a mace that can switch to a flail.

 Aqune
 
 Aqune (pronounced "A-coo-nay") is a Spider Rider in the service of the Invectid Buguese. Aqune wears a mask that covers her face, which contains a mind control device. She has a deep sense of honor: while fighting Hunter and being unmasked, they both fell from a cliff, and Aqune took care of Hunter and refused to fight him because he was injured and weakened. Then after Buguese found them, Buguese tried to destroy Hunter once and for all but Aqune parries his blow, making him cease attack. Aqune is Mantid's weapon ready to use against the Riders. It seems that Buguese found her and her spider lost in the Forest of Bewilderment where anyone who enters become disoriented and cannot find the exit. The website itself claims that she was banned after caring for a weakened enemy and was taken into by the Invectids. Buguese seems to call her "Oracle's Chosen" and uses her to find the Oracle Keys. When unmasked, Aqune cares much for Hunter, as she showed this by giving the Oracle Key back to Hunter. In episode "Paradise", her mask is broken, releasing her and Portia from Buguese's control. This lasts for only a few episodes however. In "Reunions", Buguese plants a new mask on her, returning her to the side of evil. Queen Illuma has revealed Aqune is Corona's sister. She uses a glaive when unarmored, but her weapon of choice when transformed is a long sword. Aqune is a better cook than Corona. In "Welcome Back," Buguese releases her from the control of her mask, permanently.

 King Arachna I
 The first Spider Rider known for defeating the Invectid army in ancient times which brought the Spider Riders' creation. He even stopped Mantid from taking the Oracle Keys. King Aracha I may be a Human.

 Brade/Quake
 The legendary Spider Rider made famous by a play that praises his ability to destroy the evil within enemies without taking their lives. It is rumored that he brought an Oracle Key to Nuuma. Quake was last seen with The Lost Mariner, during Quake's voyage to Nuuma. Currently Quake has given up fighting and resides in a forest, taking on the form of a small old man. He helps Hunter and Aqune escape Buguese's attack and uses his power to bring all of the Spider Riders' deepest desires to come true in hope to get Hunter to never fight again. However, Hunter's bravery and stubbornness made Quake drop his spell. After repelling the Invectids through the use of his staff, Quake opened a portal so the Spider Riders could continue to Nuuma Castle. Later, Quake decided to join the Human-Invectid war and remarked that Hunter was as foolish as his grandfather, who he must have met before. It was also revealed that he fought with Mantid in the past and lost. He retreated to a forest to wait for the right moment to fight back. It is later revealed that he has been storing his power since then for the moment that the eight Spider Riders would appear and be able to defeat Mantid once and for all. When he becomes a Spider Rider again, he regains his youthful appearance. After the final battle, Quake joins the Lost Mariner and fades away as a ghost.

 Trigger Steele/Digger Steele
 Hunter's late grandfather. He was the one who taught Hunter not to give up. It is hinted in episode 12 that Digger was the one who thwarted Mantid's plan in the past. In the first episode, Hunter said his grandfather talked about the Inner World in the past. He also fought alongside Quake in the old years as a Spider Rider.

Battle Spiders

 Shadow
 
 Hunter's spider (though Shadow disagrees in the beginning), a prideful warrior who thinks he doesn't need a rider and is also very stubborn and won't admit when he's wrong, especially one who may be destined to bring disaster to Arachna (i.e., Hunter), and is like an older brother figure. He hates large crowds. He is said to have legendary strength. He complains about most of the things Hunter does, though they make a very good team. When he uses an oracle key, his two front legs grow more sturdy and his abdomen become more armored. When he uses 2 oracle keys, his two front legs grow abnormally longer and straight. When he uses 3 or 4 keys, two hands emerge and two legs grow. Shadow is a direct descendant of the Ancestral Lord of Spiders. Shadow cares for Venus, as a best friend

 Venus
 
 Corona's spider. She is soft-spoken and gentle, but is fearless in battle. She also cares for Shadow, as a best friend.

 Flame
 Igneous' silent spider. He has the ability to shoot webs made out of fire.

 Ebony
 
 Lumen's spider. Said to be very powerful and destructive, this restrains Lumen to call it out, for fear of accidentally hurting someone. When he does call him out, 'he means business' according to Igneous. He doesn't talk after his first appearance, but finally talks (much to the Spider Riders' amazement) to persuade his Rider, Prince Lumen to take his sister through the Labyrinth to get to Mantid's Castle.

 Hotarla
 
 Sparkle's spider. Unlike the other spiders, she is not a spider ready for battle and has distinctive large eyes. She'd rather not take huge, dangerous risks.

 Brutus
 
 Magma's spider. He has tremendous strength, and is looking for his sister, Portia.

 Portia
 
 Aqune's spider. She is Brutus's missing sister. Like Aqune, Portia wears a mask over her face that controls her. She is known for her unique purple color.

 Dagger
 Quake's spider. He is said to be a legendary battle spider and said to be the strongest of all.

Invectid (Insector)
The primary antagonists of the series who plot to conquer Arachna. The Invectids are a race of humanoid insects that reside in the Invectid State. Members of the Invectid race include:

 Lord Mantid
 
 Mantid is a mantis-type Invectid who rules the loose-knit nation of Invectids. From the top floor of his fortress, he directs his Invectid troops to remove the wasteful and hated humans from the Inner World and find the Oracle Keys. Although it is assumed by his followers that he is the ultimate in Invectid evolution, Mantid actually wears a covering of high fidelity mechanics, which encases the body of a human! Anyone who finds out must be slain. He needs the Oracle Keys to sustain himself for some reason or else his body turns white. With two Oracle Keys, Mantid's actions had caused the Oracle sun to go dark and prevented Hunter from using the Oracle keys. However, after regaining that ability, Mantid decided to meet Hunter face-to-face. After Hunter is captured in the Labyrinth, he is brought to Mantid's Castle and finally comes face-to-face with Mantid himself. Mantid planned to trick Hunter into getting the Oracle Keys for him. Quake appeared and told him of Maintid's true intentions. Mantid reveals that he was a human and a chosen warrior of the Oracle, pulled against his will into the Inner World. His reason of taking the Oracle's power is revenge upon the Inner World and the Oracle herself after many losses, including his beloved. After absorbing the Oracle Keys' power, Mantid becomes extremely powerful when he becomes Oracle Mantid. Some changes in appearance are noticeable, such as his cape, which has become a mix of neon colors. The armor on his cape also becomes bigger, purple, and gains a gold border on the outer ring. The mask like thing on Mantid's face also grows out more. He also gains incredible strength and psychic abilities. After being spared with kindness by Hunter, Mantid reverts into a human and reunites with his lover Loraine.

The Big Four
Four of Mantid's mightiest warriors. They are:

 Buguese
 
 Mantid's right hand man, he is a masked humanoid Invectid with many plans to defeat the Spider Riders. He is the leader of the Big Four. He despises the Oracle, as he is bitter about her taking the sun away from the Invectids, and is eager to hurt her for what he thinks are her wrongs. Buguese claims to care little for his comrades, but he has shown respect for Stags, and concern for both Aqune, whom he is mentor to, and Beerain. Personally, he hates Hunter Steele for the many defeats at his hands. He wields a long crimson bladed sword for a weapon. Buguese has remained a loyal and faithful servant of Mantid, but over time, he lost faith and did not trust Mantid anymore. He plans to destroy the Spider Riders and take control over the Invectid Nation from Mantid. Lord Mantid gave him a machine called Dark Opal and told him to destroy the Spider Riders with it. However while battling them it absorbed the power from Hunter's Oracle keys, keeping Buguese from betraying Lord Mantid. He removes Aqune's mask, which was endowed with some of the Oracle's power by Lord Mantid and commented that over the years she had become someone precious to him. Buguese takes the remaining power of the Oracle keys that Mantid put into Aqune's mask and uses it to revive Dark Opal and goes to fight Lord Mantid himself. Dark Opal crashes into Castle Mantid, resulting in an explosion. For some reason, Oracle Mantid saved his life because he was going to use him as a tool for revenge. He is nearly killed by Mantid when one of his attacks nearly sends him off a cliff. He was saved by Beerain and Stags.

 Larva P. Grasshop
 
 A member of the Big Four. He is a grasshopper-type Invectid who uses many technological devices to defeat enemies. So far, he hasn't really fought the Riders preferring to let his minions do the fighting for him instead. Grasshop has (unfortunately for him) seen little success against the Spider Riders and is seen with disdain and disappointment by the other members of the Invectids as well as his wife Weeval and his kids.  After the incident in "Dark World," Grasshop was banished from Invectid state and forced to wander the Inner World, swearing to defeat the Spider Riders. As such, he may have mild drinking problems, but this is only speculative. Due to recently assisting the Spider Riders (Sparkle in particular) escape captivity, he is now a traitor to the Invectids. Sparkle calls him Uncle Hop. One of Grasshop's biggest achievements in helping the Spider Riders is removing the Battle Beetle's regeneration device, allowing Hunter to defeat it. According to his wife Weeval, his promotion to the Big Four was a mistake as he is peaceful and loves children. This might explain why he gets along so well with Princess Sparkle and allows her to call him "Uncle Hop". It may also explain why he is reluctant to actually fight the Spider Riders. In "Welcome Back," Grasshop tries to reason with Lord Mantid by saying that after having spent time with the humans he realized that they are not greedy and mean. He tells him he can do whatever he wants to him, but to spare the Spider Riders. Lord Mantid was going to kill Grasshop by smashing him into the ground repeatedly until Buguese stepped in and told Mantid to fulfill the promise he made. Mantid dropped Grasshop and Princess Sparkle rushed over to him. He was unhurt, just scared. Despite being a grasshopper-type Invectid, he claims he is afraid of heights or perhaps it was just a ruse not to let Oracle Mantid smash him into the ground. After he takes the Spider Riders through the sewers (as he comments that he hides in during battles), he is finally reunited with his wife and kids. He is also the only Invectid (and only other character other than Hunter) to be given a full name, although this is only in the dub.

 Beerain
 
 A bee-type Invectid who wields a whip. She is a member of the Big Four and commands the Buzzrays and has a certain charm about her. When fighting, Beerain has no regard for honor and thinks winning is everything. In "Spies and Lies," she states that she is losing faith for Lord Mantid but still has faith for Buguese and in a flashback to when he was giving her assignment, it is hinted that she may have feelings for him. In the episode "Lumen's Love," Beerain dresses up as Lumen's childhood friend. Even after Lumen finds out, he still willingly gives her the Oracle key. After Beerain is blown away and his real friend arrives, he keeps searching for her calling Beerain his "true love". She is also a former member of the Big Four but was kicked out when she found out Mantid's secret of what he wants to do with the Oracle's power. When she returned to the Invectid Fortress, Beerain overheard Mantid planning to grasp all of Oracle's power and not share it with anyone else. She barely managed to escape with her life at the hands of Mantid and Aqune. With her wings damaged, Beerain felt useless and for the first time in the series, she cried. She attempted to warn Buguese of Mantid's true intent, but he refused to believe her saying he is still faithful to Mantid and cannot trust a 'traitor'. Princess Sparkle calls her Auntie Bee. Beerain saved Buguese just when he was about to fall off a cliff after Mantid’s attack. Her name is notable in that it is one 't' removed from the name of Bee Train, the company that produces Spider Riders.

 Stags
 
 Stags is an armored stag beetle-type Invectid who is very powerful and very loyal to the Invectid cause. He wields a short Zanbato for a weapon. Stags is considered by many as the most powerful of the Big Four. He has a strong sense of honor and cannot stand when it is disrespected. Corona and Igneous once faced him, but barely managed to escape with their lives. So far, Hunter is the only one who has ever harmed him by breaking off one of Stags' horns. During his first fight with Hunter, Stags beat up Grasshop for interfering in their duel and nearly preventing his viewing of Hunter's Oracle Keys in action. Stags was ordered by Mantid to find the two Oracle Keys in Nuuma, but both slipped out of his grasp. He has now turned control of the invasion to Buguese. Stag's latest encounter with Hunter and Shadow proves he has become much stronger, since he is able to defeat Hunter even with the aid of two Oracle Keys. However, he is then defeated when Hunter uses a third Oracle Key. With his warrior spirit broken, Stags plunges from the castle into the ground below (he does not die from the fall). He then threw away his broken sword and cape and departed. Stags is yet another former member of the Big Four due to his warrior spirit being crushed. When Buguese was thrown from Dark Opal after Lord Mantid attacked him, Stags gave him water to drink. He is not angry with Buguese for seizing control over his troops at Nuuma.

Other Invectid Warriors
Other Invectid warriors and characters throughout the series.

 Buzzbit
 
 A small bug that is about the size, shape, and color of the Golden Snitch from the Harry Potter franchise. It has two wings and a pair of red eyes. Buzzbit is used by Dungobeet to spy on the Spider Riders. It relays the information it finds out to whoever sent it. It was what informed Scarab of Grasshop's demotion from the "Big Four" in episode 33. Usually Lord Mantid or Buguese is on the receiving end of a Messenger Bug.

 Unnamed Invectid Captains
 A bunch of Invectid Captains worked for Mantid. One Invectid led his troops to attack Tanda Village in search of something, but he could not remember what they were searching for. Prince Lumen promised him their own village, with him as the self-appointed mayor in exchange that they stop attacking Tanda Village. They stopped attacking and moved into their new village. He was happy for a short while but soon decided to attack again, believing that conquest was something they needed. This time, Prince Lumen fights and defeats him.

 Dungobeet
 A dung beetle-type Invectid who works as their spy. He likes to roll on a ball. Dungobeet sometimes rats on Grasshop to Grasshop's family. During a mission in the Labyrinth, he and Aqune used a Special Whistle to anger the creatures of the Maze. After Hunter is captured, Dungobeet attempts to destroy the Spider Riders again with the beasts, but is captured by Quake.

 Weeval
 Weeval is a weevil-type Invectid and Grasshop's wife. She appears taller than her husband and makes big curfews on him which he must follow or he would not get his dinner. She may have a goof for a husband, but he's her goof. When Hunter told her that Grasshop was safe, Weeval was very relieved. She cares very much for Grasshop and also has two little children. Weeval and her two children were scared when the ground started shaking and wanted Grasshop to come home and save them. Upon hoping for this, Grasshop walked in the door much to their delight. She is only named in the English dub.

 Scarab
 
 A scarab beetle-type Invectid and leader of an Invectid transport platoon seen in episode 33. He is only named in the dub.

 Ninja Bug
 This Invectid's true name was not mentioned in the show, but it had the ability to project copies of itself. The true Invectid was revealed when Shadow shot his spider threads at the copies until there was only one which Hunter struck, sending it out the castle. It was used as a reconnaissance agent by Stags before the invasion. The story does not reveal if the Ninja Bug had been destroyed.

 Unnamed Flying Invectid
 This Invectid had attacked the Spider Rider's ship on the journey back home from Nuuma. It appeared to spray a sort of powder when Shadow and Hunter tried to hold them back.

Invectid Foot Soldiers
The Invectid Foot Soldiers are the foot soldiers of the Invectids. They come in different varieties and often accompany any member of the Big Four or any other field commanders. Some of these variations include:

 Original Foot Soldiers - These are the lesser version of the Invectid Foot Soldiers. They are usually commanded by Buguese and Grasshop and even other high-ranked members of the Invectid Army.
 Stags' Foot Soldiers - These come in two varieties. White foot soldiers are the most common variety. They use curved clubs/swords to combat their opponents. The second variety are tan and use throwing knives that resemble Stags' sword.
 Mantid's Royal Guards - These soldiers only seem to serve within Castle Mantid. They seem to resemble ants.
 Enhanced Invectid Warriors - Invectids made from science and the Oracle's power. They are very fast and strong. One was able to stand against the power of 2 Oracle Keys before being thrown back. They do not talk much.

Buzzrays
The Buzzrays are flying manta ray-like soldiers of the Invectids. They seem to only appear with Beerain.

Invectid machines
Giant metal insects used by the Invectids. Among those are:

 Smashopper - A giant metal grasshopper-type Invectid machine that battles Hunter in episode 1 while Grasshop rides on him.
 Praying Mantech - A giant metal mantis-type Invectid machine that Buguese rides on in his battle against Hunter and Corona near the memorial of King Arachna I. Praying Mantech opens up part of his armor when he uses his missile launcher causing a weak spot.
 Billbug - A giant metal pill bug-type Invectid Machine that fought Magma and Brutus in the Forest of Bewilderment. It is indestructible when in its ball form. It was defeated by Magma.
 Sphere-Beetle - An Invectid Machine that has three stages. The first form was little harmless balls called "sparkling orbs" which kids found in a crack. The second form is when the orbs fuse to create a light built Invectid. In this form it uses telekinesis to use the kids as a shield. The last form is created when the last unclaimed orbs (too deep in the crack to reach) fuse into the beetle to create a heavier built beetle. It still keeps its telekinesis but since it is so large it cannot use the human shield as effectively requiring a camouflage technique that rendered itself invisible.
 Celpido - A giant metal centipede-type Invectid machine used by Buguese. Celpido caused sinkholes in a village to destroy it. Celpido is the first Invectid machine to have the power of speech. It also has feelings, which may mean he is organic.
 Battle Beetle - A giant metal beetle-type Invectid machine used by Buguese when fighting the Spider Riders within Oracle's Shrine. This Battle Beetle has the ability to blind its enemies with a bright light when it opens its armor. This beetle has shown its mass strength as Lumen, Igneous, Corona, and Magma struggled to survive against it. Hunter defeated it in one shot using the Elektra Twist for the first time in the episode "A New Power." Another one was introduced in "Protectors of Life" and this one had laser cannons and the ability to regenerate damaged parts. Grasshop managed to uninstall the device that enabled this, allowing Hunter to finish the bot.
 Cyber Cricket - A giant cricket-type Invectid machine that uses sound waves as its main attack. It was destroyed in the second battle by the combined force of Igneous and Magma after it attacked Hunter when he got in the way of its attack on Corona.
 Battle Bug - A giant metal beetle-type Invectid machine used by Grasshop. In "Wages of War," Grasshop used it to capture an Invectid named Katy, but forgot to install the device that determined friend from foe, causing it to attack him. It is armed with a laser cannon and it gets more powerful the more Katy fears fighting. He told Hunter its weakness out of cowardice; slash off both antennae at exactly the same time or they will grow back. Hunter and Aqune defeated it together.
 Iron Ant - A giant metal ant-type Invectid machine that Grasshop used after Hunter foiled his chase upon the Nuuman Page. It has powerful pincers and large contact lenses as ants can't see very well. Hunter almost lost his life fighting this Invectid machine solo.
 Robo-Beetle - A giant beetle-type Invectid Mecca that is strong enough to survive the attack of 1 Oracle Key. It was destroyed when Hunter combined 2 Oracle Keys.
 Golden Bore - A huge Invectid Mecha that produces an indestructible shield called Gold Rush and a powerful burst of energy called Gold Fever that defeats all enemies in the area. He doesn't like to be bossed around, and tends to call Grasshop "little bug". He really loves regurgitated grubs and sugar as his magic words were "Pretty please with sugar on top". His only weakness is that when he falls on his back he can't get up. He is the second Invectid battle machine that can talk.
 Buzz-Warrior - One of Beerain's machines which she used in "Spies and Lies" to fight Hunter. She fought honorably, but still lost to Hunter even though he never used the Oracle Key. It's capable of creating high winds and fires stingers from its abdomen.
 Dark Opal - An extremely powerful machine created by two Oracle Keys. It has laser beams in its eyes, mandibles that shoot a big energy sphere and the ability to absorb the Oracle Key's power. It is the first Invectid battle machine that can be piloted. It was most likely destroyed in the explosion seen in "Welcome Back".
 Ark of Destiny - A boat created by Mantid. It was possibly used by Mantid to return to The Outer World as Mantid is actually a human wearing a mechanical suit. It is capable of firing energy beams. If destroyed, Mantid can just resurrect it.

Other characters
Other characters who make appearances throughout the series, sometimes only once.

 The Spirit Oracle
 
 The Spirit Oracle is a beautiful woman, who united both human and spiders together. Her clothes are always flying as if wind was blowing. All the time, the Spirit Oracal has her eyes closed and moves her hands. King Arachna I and his Spider are the first ones to see her. Hunter also saw her when he fell down to the Inner World. She chose Corona and Aqune to be her handmaidens. It is possible that Corona and Aqune might have seen her before. The Spirit Oracle is the goddess of the Inner World. Whenever anything sacred to her is destroyed, it hurts her. The Spirit Oracle's power cannot be used with wicked intent as seen when Aqune tried to kill Beerain, the Oracle cried and took the power away from her and when Hunter was going to deliver the finishing blow to Mantid, she cried. Following Mantid's defeat, the Spirit Oracle granted his wish where she returned him to human form and reunited him with Loraine.

 Lily
 
 Lily is Arachna castle's mystic prophet. She was the first to find out that Hunter had entered the Inner world and feared he would bring misfortune.

 Quint
 
 Quint was the builder of the finest ship in the town of Fuushyua which could go up the upwards waterfall. However, he wouldn't lend it to the Spider Riders to get to Nuuma. When the Invectids destroyed him ship and Hunter saved him, Quint didn't fuss over the loss of the ship. He revealed he had a new and improved ship and this time, gave it to the Riders on the condition that they return it. However, it was left at a port in Nuuma and he went all steaming about it but settled down. He has a picture of the Lost Mariner who is his great-great grandfather.

 Slate
 
 Slate (called Grey in the Japanese version) was once an Arachnian knight who was a good friend and rival to Igneous. They were both known as the legendary "Fang and Claw" to everyone. However, he left the rank of knights a long time ago but came back and challenged Igneous to a duel to the end. Hunter did a little investigating and found out Grasshop took a pendant of value from Slate and said he would return it once Slate defeated Igneous. In exchange for defeating Igneous, Grasshop agreed not to destroy Slate's village. Hunter and Shadow were able to successfully drive away Grasshop's occupation force. Even though the Invectids were gone, the two knights still fought and they concluded that they were equally matched. A few episodes later, Slate had arrived to help Arachna against an Invectid invasion, but it had been already driven off. However, Prince Lumen left him in charge of Arachna castle while the Spider Riders helped the people of Nuuma.

 Sea Buff Mariner/Lost Mariner
 
 When he was young, he helped Quake deliver two of the Oracle keys to Nuuma. Many years later he helps the Spider Riders get through a fog when they were under attack from Beerain and her Stingrays in "Ghost Ship". With the task done, he mysteriously disappeared, frightening Igneous, believing he was a ghost. Whether or not he is a ghost is never revealed. He is the great, great, great grandfather of the ship builder Quint.

 Queen Elma/Illuma
 
 The Queen of Nuuma, who sensed a familiar connection concerning Corona and Nuuma. When Illuma attempts to discover more about Corona's childhood, Corona is only able to reveal that she can only recall her parents named her "Corona". It is later revealed that Illuma recognizes that Corona and her sister, Aqune, from when they were children who often visited Nuuma and that they are both Oracle Handmaids. Illuma initially rejects the Spider Riders' offer to defend to castle because she feared they were too young. However, after Hunter and Corona disobey her orders and run off, she asks all her troops to fight under the command of the Spider Riders. Igneous has a secret crush on her, but his feelings are not reciprocated as Illuma actually loves Solan. At one point it looked like she was running into Igneous' arms but she was really running past Igneous into Solan's arms.

 Toure/Solan
 A loyal page at Castle Nuuma who serves Queen Illuma and acts as her confidante. He guides the Spider Riders, upon their arrival into the city, to the castle, which has been lifted into the air. While he is surprised to see the Spider Riders are so young, he has faith in them. He and Queen  Illuma are in love with one another.

 Lemin/Katy
 A Katydid-type Invectid who lives with the humans. She is a pacifist, so she left the Invectid Nation to live a peaceful life. Lemin was branded a traitor and is currently wanted for treason against Mantid.

 Sklar the Soul Eater
 This ancient evil lies hidden in a tomb beneath a desert. Its power is kept in check by five mystic gems. He only appeared in the book series.

 Lady Noia
 
 A childhood friend of Prince Lumen's. Beerain impersonates her in order to sneak into Arachna Castle and steal Hunter's Oracle Keys while Grasshop disguised himself as Lady Noia's assistant. Unfortunately, the attempt was thwarted several times because Lumen, who had fallen in love with her (Noia), was always going to check up on her, giving her no time to sneak away. After Beerain discards her disguise, Lumen continues to pursue her and misses the arrival of the real Lady Noia.

References

Spider Riders